Transition metal carbonate and bicarbonate complexes are coordination compounds containing carbonate (CO32-) and bicarbonate (HCO3-) as ligands.  The inventory of complexes is large, enhanced by the fact that the carbonate ligand can bind metal ions in a variety of bonding modes.

Bonding modes

Carbonate

Carbonate is a pseudohalide ligand.  With a saturated pi-system, it has no pi-acceptor properties. With multiple electronegative elements, it is not strongly basic.  The latter is consistent with the pKa’s of carbonic acid: pK1 = 6.77 and pK2 = 9.93.

To a single metal ion, carbonate is observed to bind in both unidentate (κ1-) and bidentate (κ2-) fashions. In the covalent bond classification method, κ1-carbonate is anX ligand and κ2-carbonate is an X2 ligand. With two metals, the number of bonding modes increases because carbonate often serves as a bridging ligand. It can span metal-metal bonds as in [Ru2(CO3)4Cl2]5-, where again it functions as an (X)2 ligand. In such cases, carbonate is an LX ligand, providing 3e- to each metal. More complicated motifs have been characterized by X-ray crystallography including {(VO)6(μ-OH)9(CO3)4}5-.

Bicarbonate

The bonding modes of bicarbonate are more limited than those for carbonate, in part because it is less basic and in part because the proton occupies a metal-binding site.  Typical bicarbonate is assumed to bind as a unidentate X ligand. Structural studies on such complexes are, however, rare.

Synthesis
Carbonato complexes are prepared by salt metathesis reactions using alkali metal carbonate salts as precursors.  In some cases, bicarbonate intermediates are implicated since carbonate does not exist in appreciable concentrations near neutral pH. The other chief route to metal carbonato complexes involves addition of CO2 to metal oxides.  Such reactions may be catalyzed by water since the carbonation of metal hydroxides is particularly well established.  Isotope labeling studies show that these reactions can proceed (and perhaps usually proceed) without scission of the M-OH bond (L = generic ligand):

Many esoteric routes have been demonstrated.  For example, the deoxygenation of peroxycarbonate by tertiary phosphines:

Carbon dioxide undergoes disproportionation upon reaction with low-valence metals.

Reactions
Most fundamental reactivity of bicarbonate/carbonato complexes is their interconversion.  This acid-base reaction has been examined mainly for unimolecular complexes. Such reactions are molecular versions of the familiar reaction of acids with carbonate minerals.  

Protonation of carbonato complexes gives the corresponding bicarbonate. The structure of bicarbonate complex indicates that protonation occurs at the coordinated oxygen. This process is the microscopic reverse or the first step in the carbonation of metal hydroxides. Protonation of bicarbonate ligands results in loss of carbon dioxide and formation of the metal hydroxide.

Examples
Their formation and uses as reagents have been extensively examined.

Few homoleptic carbonato complexes have been characterized.  One is [Zr(CO3)4]4-, featuring 8-ccordinate Zr(IV).  Tris(carbonato)cobalt(III) ([Co(CO)3]3-) is another possible example.

Uses
Metal carbonato and bicarbonate complexes are of no direct commercial importance.  They do illustrate the potential fate of low valent complexes when exposed to air.  They also illustrate deleterious products in schemes aimed toward the reduction of carbon dioxide to useful chemicals and fuels.

In the biological sphere, zinc bicarbonate complexes are central intermediates in the action of the carbonic anhydrase.

References

Coordination complexes
Inorganic chemistry
Carbonates